Per-Anders Sääf (born 11 April 1965) is a Swedish former volleyball player. He competed in the men's tournament at the 1988 Summer Olympics.

References

External links
 

1965 births
Living people
Swedish men's volleyball players
Olympic volleyball players of Sweden
Volleyball players at the 1988 Summer Olympics
Sportspeople from Halmstad
Sportspeople from Halland County